Lohne (Oldb) is a railway station located in Lohne, Germany. The station is located on the Delmenhorst–Hesepe railway and the train services are operated by NordWestBahn.

Train services
The station is served by the following services:

Local services  Osnabrück - Bramsche - Vechta - Delmenhorst - Bremen

References

External links
 

Railway stations in Lower Saxony